This is a list of Tokumei Sentai Go-Busters episodes. Each episode is called a "Mission".

Episodes


{| class="wikitable" width="98%"
|- style="border-bottom:8px solid #B60000"
! width="4%" | Ep. no. !! Title !! Writer !! Original airdate
|-|colspan="4" bgcolor="#e6e9ff"|

Special Ops Sentai, Assemble!

|-|colspan="4" bgcolor="#e6e9ff"|

A Promise Made 13 Years Ago

|-|colspan="4" bgcolor="#e6e9ff"|

GT-02 Animal, Deploy!

|-|colspan="4" bgcolor="#e6e9ff"|

Special Ops and Determination

|-|colspan="4" bgcolor="#e6e9ff"|

Dangerous Overheated Rampage!

|-|colspan="4" bgcolor="#e6e9ff"|

Combine! Go-Buster-King

|-|colspan="4" bgcolor="#e6e9ff"|

Bad Maintenance on the Ace?!

|-|colspan="4" bgcolor="#e6e9ff"|

Protect the Machine Blueprints!

|-|colspan="4" bgcolor="#e6e9ff"|

Usada Recovery Strategy!

|-|colspan="4" bgcolor="#e6e9ff"|

The Reason We Fight

|-|colspan="4" bgcolor="#e6e9ff"|

The Targeted Weakpoint

|-|colspan="4" bgcolor="#e6e9ff"|

You Like Going Undercover?

|-|colspan="4" bgcolor="#e6e9ff"|

A Surprising Day Off

|-|colspan="4" bgcolor="#e6e9ff"|

Ça va? Rescue Strategy

|-|colspan="4" bgcolor="#e6e9ff"|

The Golden Warrior and the Silvery Buddy

|-|colspan="4" bgcolor="#e6e9ff"|

The Man Who Came From Subspace

|-|colspan="4" bgcolor="#e6e9ff"|

Its Name Is Go-Buster Beet!

|-|colspan="4" bgcolor="#e6e9ff"|

Cooperative Operations 3,000 Meters In the Earth

|-|colspan="4" bgcolor="#e6e9ff"|

My Combination! Buster Hercules

|-|colspan="4" bgcolor="#e6e9ff"|

Five-Part Concentration! Great Go-Buster!

|-|colspan="4" bgcolor="#e6e9ff"|

Farewell, Blue Buster

|-|colspan="4" bgcolor="#e6e9ff"|

The Beautiful Avatar: Escape

|-|colspan="4" bgcolor="#e6e9ff"|

Those Who Follow Their Intent

|-|colspan="4" bgcolor="#e6e9ff"|

A très bien Summer Festival

|-|colspan="4" bgcolor="#e6e9ff"|

Pursue the Mystery of the Avatars!

|-|colspan="4" bgcolor="#e6e9ff"|

The Tiny Enemy! Control Room SOS

|-|colspan="4" bgcolor="#e6e9ff"|

An Out of Control Combo to Escape the Labyrinth!

|-|colspan="4" bgcolor="#e6e9ff"|

Beware of Chickens!

|-|colspan="4" bgcolor="#e6e9ff"|

Breaking Into Subspace!

|-|colspan="4" bgcolor="#e6e9ff"|

Messiah Shutdown

|-|colspan="4" bgcolor="#e6e9ff"|

Space Sheriff Gavan Arrives!

|-|colspan="4" bgcolor="#e6e9ff"|

Friendship Tag With Gavan!

|-|colspan="4" bgcolor="#e6e9ff"|

Morphin! Powered Custom

|-|colspan="4" bgcolor="#e6e9ff"|

The Enemy Is Beet Buster?!

|-|colspan="4" bgcolor="#e6e9ff"|

Roar, Tategami Lioh!

|-|colspan="4" bgcolor="#e6e9ff"|

Go-Buster Lioh, Kaching!

|-|colspan="4" bgcolor="#e6e9ff"|

The Black and White Brides

|-|colspan="4" bgcolor="#e6e9ff"|

Event! Ace Deathmatch

|-|colspan="4" bgcolor="#e6e9ff"|

Finishing Blow! Messiah's Fist

|-|colspan="4" bgcolor="#e6e9ff"|

Covering Jay and the Messiahloid

|-|colspan="4" bgcolor="#e6e9ff"|

The Thief Pink Buster!

|-|colspan="4" bgcolor="#e6e9ff"|

Attack! Within the Megazord

|-|colspan="4" bgcolor="#e6e9ff"|

Christmas Determination

|-|colspan="4" bgcolor="#e6e9ff"|

Christmas Eve: Time to Complete the Mission

|-|colspan="4" bgcolor="#e6e9ff"|

Happy New Year: A Small Formidable Enemy, Again

|-|colspan="4" bgcolor="#e6e9ff"|

The New Fusion and Overheated Rampage!

|-|colspan="4" bgcolor="#e6e9ff"|

Reset and Back-Up

|-|colspan="4" bgcolor="#e6e9ff"|

Setting the Trap

|-|colspan="4" bgcolor="#e6e9ff"|

Preparation and Selection

|-|colspan="4" bgcolor="#e6e9ff"|

Eternal Bonds

|}

References

Tokumei Sentai Go-Busters